Amandagamani Abhaya, also referred as Aḍagamunu, was King of Anuradhapura in the 1st century, whose reign lasted from 21 A.D to 30 A.D. He succeeded his father Mahadathika Mahanaga as King of Anuradhapura and was succeeded by his brother Kanirajanu Tissa. He is recorded in historical chronicles as a great patron of Buddhism.

Enacting of the state law known as 'Maghatha' can be termed as a noble deed done by him. It banned all animal slaughter in the country. It is said that Amandagamini built a temple known as 'Ridi Viharaya' near the Kurunegala area and renovated many other temples.

Amandagamini used to offer baskets of sweet fruits to the Sangha. Therefore, historical chronicles state that the word 'Āmanḍa' was also added to his original name, 'Gamini Abhaya' during his reign.

See also
 List of Sri Lankan monarchs
 History of Sri Lanka

References

External links
 Kings & Rulers of Sri Lanka
 Codrington's Short History of Ceylon

Monarchs of Anuradhapura
A
 Sinhalese Buddhist monarchs
A
A